Ashaig (referring to a ferry) is a small township, situated adjacent to Upper Breakish and Lower Breakish near Broadford on the island of Skye, Scotland. For administrative purposes, it lies in the Highland Council area.

History

Connection with St Maelrubha
The old burial ground at Ashaig, which is still in use, reflects the site's ancient religious associations. By tradition, it is closely connected with St. Maelrubha (c.642-722), the apostle to Skye, who is said variously to have sailed over from Applecross (on a large flat stone) and to have occupied the small island of Pabay opposite the beach. Also in the burial ground are several Commonwealth War Graves, the majority of these being casualties from the warship HMS Curacoa which sank following a collision with the ocean liner Queen Mary, which it was escorting at the time. There are still to be seen the sacred spring that started when the saint tore a small tree from the ground and a rocky crag above the river, which he is said to have used as a pulpit (Creag an leabhair, "the rock of the book"). The saint's bell, which is supposed to have hung from a tree and to have pealed of its own accord in order to summon the faithful, is no longer in evidence.

Archaeological remains
The spring is covered by a stone-built well-house. Conservation work in 1994 revealed that it was fed by a channel from an earlier stone-lined spring. A neolithic axe was also found near the spring.

Within the burial ground, the remains of a mediaeval church ("Cill Ashik") were still in existence as late as the middle of the 19th century.

Transport
Ashaig is situated on the A87 road.

Airfield
Ashaig is the site of Broadford Airfield which was built in 1972. It is no longer used for commercial flights, as these came to an end in 1988. It is currently used by a flying club and emergency services.  There is a large and attractive sandy beach at the end of the airstrip, except at high tide.

The airfield was featured in the 1980 movie Flash Gordon.

References

External links

Canmore - Ashaig site record

Populated places in the Isle of Skye
Beaches of Scotland
Christianity in medieval Scotland
Holy wells in Scotland
Springs of Scotland
Landforms of the Isle of Skye
Landforms of Highland (council area)